Last Exit to Garageland is the debut album of New Zealand band Garageland, released in June 1996 on Flying Nun Records. The album was reissued in the UK on Discordant Records and in the US on Foodchain Records in September 1997. In 2003, Foodchain issued a newer release which included bonus tracks.

Track listing

1996 Flying Nun release
"Fingerpops"
"Classically Diseased"
"Beelines to Heaven"
"Come Back"
"Nude Star"
"Fire Away"
"Tired and Bored"
"I'm Looking For What I Can't Get"
"Never Gonna Come Around Here Again"
"Return to You"
"Jesus I'm Freezing"
"Underground Nonsense"

2003 Foodchain release
Intro
Fingerpops
Classically Diseased
Nude Star
Pop Cigar
Beelines To Heaven
Come Back
Fire Away
Tired And Bored
I'm Looking For What I Can't Get
Never Gonna Come Around Here Again
Return To You
Jesus I'm Freezing
Fay Ray
Underground Nonsense
So You Want To Be A Rock N' Roll Star
Bus Stops
Struck
Graduation From Frustration
One Shot
Shouldn't Matter But It Does
Cherry Cola Vodka (Hold The Ice)

2017 Deluxe reissue
 Fingerpops (03:18)
 Classically Diseased (02:59)
 Beelines To Heaven (03:02)
 Come Back (03:20)
 Nude Star (05:27)
 Fire Away (02:27)
 Tired And Bored (03:55)
 I'm Looking For What I Can't Get (02:37)
 Never Gonna Come Around Here Again (04:04)
 Return To You (03:05)
 Jesus I'm Freezing (04:57)
 Underground Nonsense (03:07)
 Struck (03:27)
 What Will You Do (03:01)
 Fay Ray (02:58)
 Pop Cigar (04:46)
 Bus Stops (04:11)
 Something's Got A Hold (02:31)
 The Florida Impetigo Experience (02:59)
 Cherry Cola Vodka (Hold The Ice) (01:22)
 Feel Alright (04:06)
 One Shot (03:09)

Personnel
 Jeremy Eade - guitar, vocals, lead guitar, organ
 Andrew Gladstone - drums, vocals, percussion, organ
 Mark Silvey - bass
 Debbie Silvey - guitar
 Murray Smith - keyboard on "Beelines to Heaven"
 Margaret Cooke - cello on "Beelines to Heaven"
 'The most Rev. Jimmy Deep plays on "intro" and "outro"' (liner notes)

References

Garageland albums
1996 debut albums
Flying Nun Records albums